Garacad is a historic coastal town in the north east central Mudug region of Puntland, an autonomous state of Somalia. There is currently work to build a new port in the harbour of Garacad.

See also 

 Gara'ad port

References

Garacad

External links
Satellite view of Garacad (zoomable)

Populated places in Mudug